The Federação Cearense de Futebol (English: Football Association of Ceará state) was founded on March 23, 1920, and it manages all the official football tournaments within the state of Ceará, which are the Campeonato Cearense and the Campeonato Cearense lower levels, and represents the clubs at the Brazilian Football Confederation (CBF).

Current clubs in Brasileirão 
As of 2022 season. Common team names are noted in bold.

References

Cearense
Football in Ceará
Sports organizations established in 1920